The 1943 Virginia Cavaliers football team represented the University of Virginia during the 1943 college football season. The Cavaliers were led by seventh-year head coach Frank Murray and played their home games at Scott Stadium in Charlottesville, Virginia. They competed as independents, finishing with a record of 3–4–1.

Schedule

References

Virginia
Virginia Cavaliers football seasons
Virginia Cavaliers football